Mangaloreans (Tulu: Kudladaklu; Kannada: Mangaloorinavaruu; Konkani: Kodialkar; Beary: Maikaltanga; Urdu: Kaudalvale) are a collection of diverse ethnic groups that hail from the historical locales of South Canara (Tulunaad) on the south western coast of Karnataka, India, particularly the residents native to Mangaluru.

History

Classical history
According to the works of Sangam literature (300 BCE - 300 CE), Tulu Nadu was one of the 12 socio-geographical regions included in the ancient Tamilakam. Tulu Nadu must certainly at one time have formed part of ancient Kerala (Chera dynasty), where the western coastal dialect of Old Tamil was spoken. It must have separated from Tamilakam sometime between 300 CE and 500 CE, when the Kadambas invaded the northern portions of Chera kingdom. No definite historical record relating to Tulu Nadu, other than those were found from Sangam literature, have been found of earlier date than 8th or 9th century CE.

Emergence of Tulunaad as a distinct cultural entity

Historically, Tulunaad included the two separate lands of Haiva and Tuluva. The Ballal kings of Sullia had ruled this area around 1100 years back. The Tulu Brahmin migration to Tulunaad might have happened during the lifetime of the Kadamba king Mayuravarma at 345 AD. During the 13th century, the Hindu philosopher Madhvacharya built the Ashta Mathagalu (eight temple complexes) in the present-day Udipi district, that was partitioned from the older South Canara district, other parts being Mangalore district and Kassergode district.

During the rule of Vijayanagara, Tulu Nadu comprised two administrative subdivisions— Mangaluru and Barakuru along with others such as the Hosdurg fort in Kassergode. In Tulunaad lied the home turf of the Tuluva dynasty, the third to take charge of the Vijayanagara dynasty. Tulu Nadu was governed by feudatories of the Vijayanagara Empire until the 17th century. The longest reigning dynasty of Tulu Nadu were the Alupas, feudatories and nobility of the prominent dynasties of Carnatic region. The Kadamba dynasty of Banavasi was the earliest, under which the Alupas flourished. Later the Rashtrakutas of Manyakheta, Chalukyas of Badami, Chalukyas of Kalyani, Hoysalas of Durasamudra& Rayas (kings) of Vijayanagara were the overlords. The Alupas however, were feudatories, since they ruled as subordinates in the Vijaynagara dominion of Tulunaad from 14th century onwards. The area became prosperous during the Vijayanagara period, with Barcoor and Mangalore gaining importance. After the decline of the Vijayanagara Empire, much of Tulu Nadu came under the control of the Keladi Nayakas of Ikkeri.

Jain Bunts were already a prominent group and even today are uniquely preserved in Tulunaad. Though small in number, the Jains left behind indelible reminders of their past with a number Jain sites (bastis) in Moodabidri; and monoliths of Bahubali and the Gomateshwara in Karkala, Venoor& Dharmasthala. Over the centuries, more ethnic groups migrated to the area. Various Hindu Konkani people namely Gaud Saraswat Brahmins, Daivajnya Brahmins, Karhad Brahmins; also a few Chitpavans (Konkanastha Brahmins), Vaishya Vanis& Rajapur Saraswat Brahmins arrived by sea, during the period of religious oppression by the intolerant Portuguese colonial regime.

Mangalore was a major port caught up in the  Indian Ocean trade since times immemorial. The area around Mangalore along with St Mary's islands and Barcelor, also served as a maritime trade post for the Portuguese in Goa and Bombay, until Shivappa Nayaka defeated Portugal's armada in battle. In the 16th century, the area saw the first arrival of Konkani New Christians who were fleeing the Inquisition in Portuguese Goa and were given refuge by Vijayanagar, the influx of migrants resumed with the cruel Mahratta Invasion of Goa and Bombay when they were again given refuge, particularly by Rani Chennamma of Kittur. The settlements of these New Christians in the area gave rise to their own unique and hybrid culture, they developed into a localised community of Mangalorean Christians, who are distinct from Goan Christians and Bombay East Indians. They built a number of prominent educational institutions and contributed to socio-economic progress in the area. The Muslims of Tulu Nadu are basically descended from Arabian traders who intermarried local women and settled there. Muslims in Mangalore speak Beary language which is different from Hindi-Urdu. A few Konkani Muslims and Konkani Jains are also found near the border with Karwar district (North Canara).

Demographics
Majority of Mangaloreans belong to the Tuluva ethnic group. The Tuluvas have historically been concentrated in the coastal areas. The major Tulu speaking castes are Shettigar, Mundalas, Mogeras, Okkaliga Gowda's, Bairas, Samagaras, Billavas, Sapaliga,Rajaka (Madival), Bunts, Mogaveeras, Kulala's, Devadiga's, Tulu Brahmins, Vishwakarmas& Nayak's. Mangalorean Protestants are mostly Tulu speakers. Beary speaking muslims are next largest community. Konkani people, in particular the Gaud Saraswat Brahmins, Daivadnya Brahmins, and the Mangalorean Catholics whose ancestors migrated here from the Konkan region, to escape the Portuguese Inquisition in Goa and Bombay-Bassein and the Mahratta Sackings of Goa and Bombay-Bassein. Other groups who historically settled in Tulu Nadu, include the Kundagannadans and Byaris and Urdu Speaking Muslims.

Culture

Cuisine

Mangalorean cuisine is largely influenced by the South Indian cuisine, with several cuisines being unique to the diverse communities of the city. Coconut meat and curry leaves are common ingredients in Mangalorean curries, as are ginger, garlic& chilli. The Tulu community's well-known dishes include Kori Rotti (dry rice flakes dipped in gravy), Chicken Ghee Roast, Bangude Pulimunchi (silver-grey mackerels), Beeja-Manoli Upkari, Neer dosa (lacy rice-crêpes), Boothai Gasi, Kadabu, and Patrode. The Kube Sukkhe, a clam dish of Mangalorean Protestants is also very popular. The Konkani community's specialities include Daali thoy, beebe-upkari (cashew based), val val, avnas ambe sasam, Kadgi chakko, and chana gashi. Tuluva vegetarian cuisine in Mangalore, also known as Udupi cuisine is known for its signature dishes like the masala dosa. Udupi restaurants are found throughout south India, northwestern India& relished overseas by the Indian diaspora. Since Mangalore is a coastal town, fish dishes are the staple diet of most people. Mangalorean Catholic cuisine includes Sanna-Dukra Maas (Sanna –idli fluffed with toddy or yeast; Dukra Maas –Pork), Pork Bafat& Sorpotel; and the Mutton Biryani of the local Muslims are well-known delicacies. Sheindi (toddy), a country wine prepared by toddy tappers from coconut flowers or tree sap is local speciality.

Traditions
Many classical dance forms and folk art are practised among Mangaloreans. The Yakshagana, a night-long dance and drama performance, is held in Mangalore,  while Hulivesha (literally, tiger dance), a folk dance unique to the city, is performed during Dasara and Krishna Janmashtami. Karadi Vesha (bear dance) is another well known dance performed during Dasara. Paddanas (Ballad-like epics passed on through generations by word of mouth) are sung by a community of impersonators in Tulu and are usually accompanied by the rhythmic drum beats. The Evkaristik Purshanv (Konkani: Eucharistic procession) is an annual Catholic religious procession led on the first Sunday of each New Year.

World record
On 26–27 January 2008, a Konkani cultural event, Konkani Nirantari, held in Mangalore by a Mangalorean organization, Mandd Sobhann, entered the Guinness Book of World Records for non-stop singing of Konkani hymns. Mandd Sobhann members sang for 40 hours, surpassing the old record of 36 hours held by a Brazilian musical troupe.

Notable Mangaloreans
 Abbakka Rani – Chowta queen of Tulu Nadu
 Abdussalam Puthige – managing director and editor in chief, Varthabharathi Kannada Daily
 Ahmed Noori – Mangalore
 Aishwarya Rai – Bollywood actress and former Miss World
 Anup Bhandari-Sandalwood director
 Augustine Francis Pinto - Chairman of Ryan International Group of Institutions
 Ashrita Shetty - Model, Kollywood actress, wife of Indian cricketer Manish Pandey
 Nirup Bhandari- Sandalwood actor
 Anant Pai – educationist and creator of Indian comics
 Anushka Shetty – Kollywood and Tollywood actress
 Aravind Adiga – writer and journalist
 Ashish Kumar Ballal – captain of the Indian National Hockey team
 Ashwini Akkunji – sprint athlete, Asian Games and Commonwealth Games gold medalist
 B. M. Idinabba – Kannada writer, poet, social activist, MLA, and freedom fighter
 B. R. Shetty – entrepreneur
 B. V. Karanth – playwright and director
 Bannanje Govindacharya – Madhava scholar
 Bolwar Mahammad Kunhi – Kannada writer
 Budhi Kunderan – cricketer
 Daya Nayak – cub-inspector in the Mumbai Police
 Deepika Padukone - Bollywood actress
 Devi Prasad Shetty – cardiac surgeon and philanthropist
 Dr. Edmond Fernandes - Global Health Leader at CHD Group & Senior Fellow, Atlantic Council
 Freida Pinto – Indian actress and model
 Ganesh Hegde – singer, performer, video director and Bollywood choreographer
 George Fernandes – Railway and Defence Minister
 Gopalakrishna Adiga – Kannada poet
 Guru Dutt – film director, producer and actor
 Gurukiran – singer, music director in the Kannada film industry
 Isha Koppikar – Bollywood actress 
 Janardhana Poojary – Former Union Minister of State for Finance
 K. L. Rahul – All formats active India cricketer
 K. S. Hegde – Former Speaker of Lok Sabha and Supreme Court Judge
 K. Shivaram Karanth – Kannada writer,  social activist, environmentalist, Yakshagana artist, film maker and thinker
 K. V. Kamath – Chairman of Infosys Limited
 Kadri Gopalnath - Carnatic musician, saxophone
 Kalpana - Indian Kannada Film Actress
 Kavya Rao – Beadiest person in Karnataka. 
 Krithi Shetty - Indian actress 
 M. Govinda Pai – Kannada poet
 M. V. Kamath – Journalist and former Chairman of Prasar Bharthi
 Madhwacharya – Hindu saint and philosopher
 M. K. Seetharam Kulal – Tulu-Kannada dramatist, poet, Karnataka State Tulu Sahitya Academy Award, Mangalorean Star
 Margaret Alva - Former Union Minister and parliamentarian
 Manvitha Harish - Sandalwood actress
 Nikhil Poojari – Indian professional football player (forward), plays for Hyderabad FC
 Nitte Santosh Hegde – justice of the Supreme Court Of India, former Solicitor General of India, and Lokayukta (ombudsman) for Karnataka State of India from 2006–2011 and activist
 Oscar Fernandes - Congress Chief Secretary and Parliamentarian
 Pooja Hegde – Miss Universe India 2010 second runner up and Kollywood actress
 Prakash Padukone – Former badminton player, most notable for winning the All England Badminton in 1980
 Prakash Raj – actor, director and producer who won the National Award winner in 2008
 Rakshith Shetty – Kannada film director and actor
 Ratnakaravarni – Kannada poet and writer
 Ravi Shastri – captain of the India national cricket team
 Reshma Shetty – American actress
 Rishab Shetty – Sandalwood director
 Rohit Shetty – Bollywood director
 Rommel Rodrigues – journalist, author, film director, screenwriter and producer
 Sanjay Manjrekar- Former Indian Cricket player and commentator
 Sandeep Chowta – Bollywood and Tollywood music director, head of Columbia Records in India
 Sheetal Mallar – model
 Shamita Shetty - Bollywood actress
 Shilpa Shetty – Bollywood actress
 Shirish Kunder – Bollywood director
 Siddhanth Thingalaya – track and field athlete
 Sneha Ullal - Bollywood actress
 Sunil Shetty – Bollywood actor, producer, and entrepreneur
 Suman Talwar - film actor
 T. M. A. Pai – doctor, educationist, banker and philanthropist who founded the university town of Manipal in Udupi
 Thumbay Moideen - Entrepreneur & Founder of Thumbay Group, UAE
 U. R. Rao – space scientist and former chairman of the Indian Space Research Organisation
 Upendra – Kannada film actor, director, screen writer, lyricist and singer
 V. J. P. Saldanha – Konkani littérateur, dramatist, novelist, short-story writer and poet
 V. Manohar – music director, lyricist, film director and actor in Kannada Cinema
 V. S. Acharya – higher education minister in the Karnataka state government
 V. T. Rajshekar – journalist, founder and editor of the Dalit Voice
 Veerappa Moily – Minister of Corporate Affairs and former chief minister of Karnataka
 Veerendra Heggade – philanthropist and the Dharmadhikari (hereditary administrator) of the Dharmasthala Temple
 Victor Rodrigues – Konkani novelist and short story writer
 Vittal Mallya – entrepreneur
 Vijay Mallya – liquor and airline baron

See also

Byaris
Konkani Brahmins
Mangalorean Christians
Tuluvers

References

 
Mangalorean society
Social groups of Karnataka
Tulu Nadu